The Maghreb lark (Galerida macrorhyncha) is a species of lark in the family Alaudidae found in the Maghreb desert of north-eastern Africa.

Taxonomy and systematics 
The Maghreb lark was previously considered to be a subspecies of the crested lark. Clements lumps this bird into the crested lark. It was proved to have diverged genetically from the latter species 1.9 million years ago was accepted as a separate species in 2009. Alban Guillaumet and colleagues noted the distinctiveness of populations from the Maghreb - birds in the dryer parts of Morocco and Tunisia had longer bills while those in more coastal northern parts had shorter bills typical of the European subspecies. The authors sampled the mitochondrial DNA and found they were distinct genetically. The species name is derived from the Ancient Greek words makros "long" and rhynchos "bill".

Subspecies 
Two subspecies are recognized:
 Hauts Plateaux Maghreb lark (G. m. randonii) - Loche, 1860: Originally described as a separate species. Found in eastern Morocco and north-western Algeria
 North-west Saharan Maghreb lark (G. m. macrorhyncha) or Long-billed Maghreb lark - Tristram, 1859: Found in southern Morocco and western Algeria to west-central Mauritania

Two syntypes of Galerida macrorhyncha Tristram (Ibis, 1859, p.57), an adult male and adult female, are held in the vertebrate zoology collection of National Museums Liverpool at World Museum, with accession numbers NML-VZ T17849 & ML-VZ T17850. The specimens were collected in Laghouat, Sahara, Algeria on 11-12 November 1856 by H. B. Tristram. The specimen came to the Liverpool national collection through the purchase of Canon Henry Baker Tristram's collection by the museum in 1896.

References 

Maghreb lark
Birds of North Africa
Maghreb lark
Taxa named by Henry Baker Tristram